The unicolored blackbird (Agelasticus cyanopus) is a species of bird in the family Icteridae. Found in Argentina, Bolivia, Brazil, and Paraguay, its natural habitat is swamps and nearby grassland. It is a fairly common bird and the International Union for Conservation of Nature has rated it a "least-concern species".

Description

The male unicolored blackbird is befitting of its name, with entirely glossy black plumage and dark eyes.  However, the species exhibits sexual dimorphism; the female is streaked brown and black with a yellow belly streaked with brown. The face has a dark mask and the wings are reddish-brown edged with black. Females from the lower Amazon region and southeastern Brazil have a generally duller colouration with less rufous wings and less yellow underparts. The legs and the irids are black and the bill is long and sharply pointed. The male could be confused with the velvet-fronted grackle or the chopi blackbird. Its call of this bird is a loud "tchew-tchew-tchew" which is sung from an elevated position, and it also produces various trills and rattling sounds which vary in tone and pitch.

Distribution and habitat
The unicolored blackbird is native to South America where its range extends from northern Bolivia and southern Brazil to northern Argentina, including much of the lower Amazon region. It is especially common in the Brazilian Pantanal.

Behaviour
This bird usually occurs in pairs and is much less gregarious than the chestnut-capped blackbird which is found in similar swampy habitat. It moves about on floating vegetation and forages among reeds, never straying far from water.

Status
The total population of the unicolored blackbird, at over 10,000 mature individuals, is believed to be stable and it has a very wide range. It is a fairly common species but its distribution is somewhat patchy. The bird seems to be facing no particular threats and the International Union for Conservation of Nature has assessed its conservation status as being of "least concern".

References

unicolored blackbird
Birds of South America
Birds of the Pantanal
unicolored blackbird
Taxa named by Louis Jean Pierre Vieillot
Birds of the Amazon Basin
Birds of Brazil
Taxonomy articles created by Polbot